The Crash Lucha Libre, also referred to as simply The Crash, is a lucha libre (Mexican professional wrestling) promotion based in Tijuana, Baja California, Mexico. The promotion largely runs its events in Tijuana, Mexico City, and Monterrey. The promotion currently has working relationships with American promotions DEFY Wrestling, PCW ULTRA, and International Wrestling Revolution Group and Promociones MDA, China's Oriental Wrestling Entertainment. The Crash previously had a working relationship with Impact Wrestling in US/Canada, Mexico's Lucha Libre AAA Worldwide and Japan's Pro Wrestling Noah between 2016 and 2018, until Konnan, the intermediary between the promotions, left The Crash. On February 21, 2019 The Crash announced a partnership with Mexico's Consejo Mundial de Lucha Libre, America's Ring of Honor and Japan's New Japan Pro-Wrestling which would later on that year end in late September, on August 12, 2019, Major League Wrestling and The Crash Lucha Libre announced a working relationship which ended in November of that year when Major League Wrestling would work full time with Lucha Libre AAA Worldwide.

The Crash is considered the fourth largest professional wrestling promotion in Mexico after the much older Consejo Mundial de Lucha Libre, Lucha Libre AAA Worldwide and International Wrestling Revolution Group promotions and has been touted as the fastest growing lucha libre company in the world. The promotion uses wrestlers from the Mexican and American independent circuit, notably wrestlers from Pro Wrestling Guerrilla. On April 6, 2018, The Crash held its first independently promoted show in the United States at The Sugar Mill in New Orleans, Louisiana.

Championships

See also
List of professional wrestling promotions in Mexico

References

External links
 (in Spanish)

 
Lucha libre
2011 establishments in Mexico
Entertainment companies established in 2011
Companies based in Tijuana